Route 221 is a collector road in the Canadian province of Nova Scotia.

It is located in Kings County and Annapolis County in the Annapolis Valley and connects Kingsport to Spa Springs.

Valley residents informally refer to Route 221 as the "Back Road", since it runs parallel to Trunk 1, but instead of running through the centre of the valley, it runs close to the less-populated southern base of the North Mountain.

Communities
Kingsport
Habitant
Canning
Sheffield Mills
Gibson Woods
Centreville 
Billtown
Lakeville
Woodville
Kinsmans Corners
Grafton
Buckleys Corner
Welsford
Dempseys Corner
Weltons Corner
North Kingston     
Spa Springs

History

The section of Collector Highway 221 from Canning to Kingsport was once designated as part of the Trunk Highway 41.

See also
List of Nova Scotia provincial highways

References

External links
Google Maps

Nova Scotia provincial highways
Roads in Annapolis County, Nova Scotia
Roads in Kings County, Nova Scotia